Kara-Teyit is a village in Osh Region,  Kyrgyzstan. It is part of the Chong-Alay District. Its population was 1,439 in 2021.

References

Populated places in Osh Region